The 1972 Grand Prix German Open was a combined men's and women's tennis tournament played on outdoor red clay courts. It was the 64th edition of the event and was part of the 1972 Commercial Union Assurance Grand Prix circuit. It took place at the Am Rothenbaum in Hamburg, West Germany, from 5 June through 11 June 1972. Manuel Orantes and Helga Masthoff won the singles titles.

Finals

Men's singles
 Manuel Orantes defeated  Adriano Panatta 6–3, 9–8, 6–0

Women's singles
 Helga Masthoff defeated  Linda Tuero 6–3, 3–6, 8–6

Men's doubles
 Jan Kodeš /  Ilie Năstase defeated  Bob Hewitt /  Ion Ţiriac 4–6, 6–0, 3–6, 6–2, 6–2

Women's doubles
 Helga Masthoff /  Heide Orth defeated  Wendy Overton /  Valerie Ziegenfuss 6–3, 2–6, 6–0

Mixed doubles
 Helga Masthoff /  Jürgen Fassbender defeated  Helga Masthoff /  Hans-Jürgen Pohmann 6–4, 6–2

References

External links
 International Tennis Federation (ITF) men's tournament edition details

German Open
Hamburg European Open
1972 in West German sport
German Open
German